I Cover Big Town is a 1947 American drama film directed by William C. Thomas and written by Maxwell Shane. The film stars Phillip Reed, Hillary Brooke, Robert Lowery, Robert Shayne, Mona Barrie and Vince Barnett. It was released on February 27, 1947 by Paramount Pictures and was the second in the Big Town series of films.

Plot
Illustrated Press society editor Lorelei Kilbourne is assigned to a police case. Her crusading newspaper editor Steve Wilson suspects that hard-luck suspect Harry Hilton has been framed on a murder rap. Lorelei and Steve proceed to help the police solve the crime, at the same time uncovering a conspiracy to bring a building firm to bankruptcy.

Cast  
Phillip Reed as Steve Wilson
Hillary Brooke as Lorelei Kilbourne
Robert Lowery as Pete Ryan
Robert Shayne as Chief Tom Blake
Mona Barrie as Dora Hilton
Vince Barnett as Louis Murkil
Louis Jean Heydt as John Moulton
Frank Wilcox as Harry Hilton
Leonard Penn as Norden Royal

Critical reception
TV Guide wrote, "It's surprising these journalists have enough time to write their stories."

References

External links 
 

1947 films
1947 crime drama films
American black-and-white films
American crime drama films
Films about journalists
Films based on radio series
Films directed by William C. Thomas
Paramount Pictures films
1940s English-language films
1940s American films
Big Town